Dig That Uranium is a 1956 film starring the comedy team of The Bowery Boys.  The film was released on January 8, 1956, by Allied Artists and is the fortieth film in the series.

Plot
An old friend of the boys returns to town and tells them stories of getting rich out west.  He proceeds to sell them a uranium mine and they head west.  When they arrive, local thugs try to chase them off.  When they find out the boys own a mine they decide to let them stay in town with the plans to follow them and take the mine from them.  Eventually the boys defeat the thugs and find the uranium, only to discover that it is on an Indian reservation and doesn't belong to them.

Cast

The Bowery Boys
Leo Gorcey as Terence Aloysius 'Slip' Mahoney
Huntz Hall as Horace Debussy 'Sach' Jones
David Gorcey as Charles 'Chuck' Anderson (Credited as David Condon)
Bennie Bartlett as Butch Williams

Remaining cast
Bernard Gorcey as Louie Dumbrowski
Raymond Hatton as Hank 'Mac' McGinty
Harry Lauter as Ron Haskell
Mary Beth Hughes as Jeanette
Carl Switzer as Shifty Robinson

Production
This film marks the last appearance in the series of Bennie Bartlett, who left, and Bernard Gorcey, who was killed in a car accident on September 11, 1955.

Home media
Warner Archives released the film on made-to-order DVD in the United States as part of "The Bowery Boys, Volume Three" on October 1, 2013.

See also
List of American films of 1956

References

External links

1956 films
1956 comedy films
American black-and-white films
Bowery Boys films
American comedy films
Allied Artists films
1950s English-language films
Films directed by Edward Bernds
1950s American films
Films about mining